Uyuni (Aymara, uyu pen (enclosure), yard, cemetery, -ni a suffix to indicate ownership, "the one that has got a pen", "the one with a pen") is a mountain in the Andes of Bolivia, about 5,084 metres (16,680 ft) high. It is situated in the Potosí Department, Antonio Quijarro Province, Tomave Municipality, Tomave Canton, east of the Uyuni salt flat and south-west of the Nuevo Mundo volcano (Jatun Mundo Quri Warani) and Kuntur Chukuña.

See also
List of mountains in the Andes

References 

Mountains of Potosí Department